Rives de l'Yon (literally Banks of the Yon) is a commune in the department of Vendée, western France. The municipality was established on 1 January 2016 by merger of the former communes of Saint-Florent-des-Bois and Chaillé-sous-les-Ormeaux.

See also
Communes of the Vendée department

References

Communes of Vendée
Populated places established in 2016
2016 establishments in France
States and territories established in 2016